The following is a list of notable people associated with Drew University:

Alumni
This is a list of notable alumni of Drew University, listing the school of Drew University that they attended, the highest degree obtained, the year of graduation or last year of attendance, and a brief description of the person. The following abbreviations are utilized for schools and degrees.

CLA = College of Liberal Arts
Grad = Graduate School
Theo = Theological School/Seminary
BA = Bachelor of Arts
BD = Bachelor of Divinity
DMin = Doctor of Ministry
DLitt = Doctor of Letters
MA = Master of Arts
MDiv = Master of Divinity
MFA = Master of Fine Arts
MLitt = Master of Letters
PhD = Doctor of Philosophy
ThD = Doctor of Theology

Faculty and staff

This is a list of notable faculty and staff members, the years that they were employed by Drew University, and a brief description of the person.

University presidents
The following is a list of the presidents of Drew University from its founding in 1867 to the present, including the years that they served as president, and a brief description of the person.

References